Anna "Anta" Birgitta Rooth (15 May 1919 – 5 June 2000) was the first Swedish professor of ethnology at Uppsala University. She is known for her research into folklore, especially the Cinderella story.

Early life and education 
Anna Birgitta Rooth was born on 15 May 1919, in Ängelholm, Sweden, to Hildegard Sofia Helena and Nore Valfrid Waldermarson. She had two brothers, Bertil and Bo Waldemarson. Rooth enjoyed reading as a child and at 19, gained a school-leaving certificate at Lunds privata elementarskola, allowing her to attend Lund University the same year.

Starting in 1938, she studied art history at Lund University. She began pursuing folkloric research and served as editor and secretary to Carl Wilhelm von Sydow, who headed folkloric research at Lund. Working as an archival assistant, Rooth began a research project which later culminated into her thesis which she defended in 1951 under the direction of Carl Wilhelm von Sydow. Her doctoral dissertation, The Cinderella Cycle, continues to be a required reading in folklore studies.

Career 
During the 1960s and 1970s, she published many more books on folklore such as Folklig Diktning. Form och teknik ("Folk Poetry: Form and Technique"), The Raven and the Carcass, and Loki in Scandinavian mythology. She also spent some time in Alaska and produced two works based on her field study of the Athabascan tribe and Inuit peoples.

In 1973, she became full professor of ethnology at Uppsala University, a position she held until 1985.

Awards and honors 
She was awarded the Pitrè Prize for her work.

Selected publications

Personal life 
In 1942, Rooth met Gösta Rooth in an art history course when he was a medical student. They had three children together, Birgitta, Helena and Ivar Rooth.

References

Further reading 
Svenskt kvinnobiografiskt lexikon

1919 births
2000 deaths
Lund University alumni
Academic staff of Uppsala University
Swedish ethnologists